In mathematical set theory, an Aronszajn line (named after Nachman Aronszajn) is a linear ordering of cardinality 
which contains no subset order-isomorphic to
  with the usual ordering
 the reverse of  
 an uncountable subset of the Real numbers with the usual ordering.

Unlike Suslin lines, the existence of Aronszajn lines is provable using the standard axioms of set theory. A linear ordering is an Aronszajn line if and only if it is the lexicographical ordering of some Aronszajn tree.

References

Order theory